The county of Hampshire is divided into 13 districts. The districts of Hampshire are Gosport, Fareham, Winchester, Havant, East Hampshire, Hart, Rushmoor, Basingstoke and Deane, Test Valley, Eastleigh, New Forest, Southampton, and Portsmouth.

As there are 549 Grade II* listed buildings in the county they have been split into separate lists for each district.

 Grade II* listed buildings in Basingstoke and Deane
 Grade II* listed buildings in City of Winchester
 Grade II* listed buildings in East Hampshire
 Grade II* listed buildings in Eastleigh (borough)
 Grade II* listed buildings in Fareham (borough)
 Grade II* listed buildings in Gosport
 Grade II* listed buildings in Havant (borough)
 Grade II* listed buildings in Hart
 Grade II* listed buildings in New Forest (district)
 Grade II* listed buildings in Portsmouth
 Grade II* listed buildings in Southampton
 Grade II* listed buildings in Rushmoor
 Grade II* listed buildings in Test Valley

See also
 Grade I listed buildings in Hampshire
 :Category:Grade II* listed buildings in Hampshire

References
National Heritage List for England

 
Hampshire
Lists of Grade II* listed buildings in Hampshire